Cem İlkel was the defending champion but chose to compete in Antalya instead.

Sebastian Korda won the title after defeating Filip Horanský 6–1, 6–1 in the final.

Seeds

Draw

Finals

Top half

Bottom half

References

External links
Main draw
Qualifying draw

Open Quimper Bretagne - 1
2021 1